Vicente Tomás Pizarro Durcudoy (born 5 November 2002) is a Chilean professional footballer who plays as a midfielder for Chilean Primera División club Colo-Colo.

Club career
Pizarro has become team captain at all levels of the Colo-Colo youth team, also playing at the 2020 U-20 Copa Libertadores. He made his professional debut in a 2021 Chilean Primera División match against Ñublense on 2 May  2021.

International career
He represented Chile U15 at the 2017 South American U-15 Championship and Chile U17 at the 2019 South American U-17 Championship – Chile was the runner-up – and at the 2019 FIFA U-17 World Cup. Also, he represented Chile U20 in a friendly tournament played in Teresópolis, Brazil, called Granja Comary International Tournament, playing all the matches against Peru U20, Bolivia U20, and Brazil U20.

He represented Chile at under-23 level in a 1–0 win against Peru U23 on 31 August 2022, in the context of preparations for the 2023 Pan American Games.

Personal life
He is the youngest child of the Chilean former international footballer Jaime Pizarro.

Honours
Colo-Colo
 Copa Chile: 2019

References

External links

Vicente Pizarro at playmakerstats.com (English version of ceroacero.es)

2002 births
Living people
People from Santiago Province, Chile
Chilean footballers
Chile youth international footballers
Chile under-20 international footballers
Colo-Colo footballers
Chilean Primera División players
Association football midfielders
Footballers from Santiago